Manu Intiraymi (born April 22, 1978) is a film actor, writer, director and producer. As an actor, he is known for playing the former Borg Icheb on the television series Star Trek: Voyager, and as Billy on One Tree Hill.

His producing ventures include the independent films Benjamin Troubles, 5th Passenger, and The Circuit.

He is bisexual.

Work

Select filmography
 Pacific Blue (TV series) as Zach – 1997
 "Cop in a Box" (Season 3, Episode 9)
 Senseless as Drug Intervention Student (1998)
 JAG (TV series) as Lester – 1998 
 "Embassy" (Season 4, Episode 2)
 Smart Guy (TV series) as Carl – 1998 
 "Henderson House Party" (Season 3, Episode 4)
 Go (1999) as Skate Punk Guy
 The King of Queens (TV series) as Zack – 1999 
 "Parent Trapped" (Season 2, Episode 4)
 Sabrina, the Teenage Witch (TV series) as Sore Throat – 1999 
 "Salem and Juliette" (Season 4, Episode 11)
 Whatever It Takes (2000) as Dunleavy
 24 (2001) co-star
 Pearl Harbor (2001) as Officer in Water Shouting "P-40's" (uncredited) 
 Star Trek: Voyager (TV series) as Icheb – 2000–2001 
 "Collective" (Season 6, Episode 16)
 "Ashes to Ashes" (Season 6, Episode 18)
 "Child's Play" (Season 6, Episode 19)
 "The Haunting of Deck Twelve" (Season 6, Episode 25)
 "Imperfection" (Season 7, Episode 2)
 "Nightingale" (Season 7, Episode 8)
 "Shattered" (Season 7, Episode 11)
 "Lineage" (Season 7, Episode 12)
 "Human Error" (Season 7, Episode 18)
 "Q2" (Season 7, Episode 19)
 "Endgame: Part 1" (Season 7, Episode 25)
 Orange County (2002) as Male Student 
 Las Vegas (TV series) as Trent – 2005 
"To Protect and Serve Manicotti" (Season 2, Episode 18)
 J. Edgar (2011) as Alvin Karpis 
 Literally, Right Before Aaron (2011, short film) as Lee 
 One Tree Hill (TV series) as Billy/Drug Dealer – 2012 
 "Love the Way You Lie" (Season 9, Episode 3)
 "Don't You Want to Share the Guilt?" (Season 9, Episode 4)
 "Last Known Surroundings" (Season 9, Episode 7)
 "A Rush of Blood to the Head" (Season 9, Episode 8)
 "Every Breath Is a Bomb" (Season 9, Episode 9)
 "Hardcore Will Never Die, But You Will" (Season 9, Episode 10)
 Fortress (2012) as Charlie 
 Star Trek: Renegades (TV series) as Icheb – 2015 
 "Pilot" (Season 1, Episode 1)
 Unbelievable!!!!! (2016) as Durwood 

Theatre
 Waiting for Godot 
 Marvin's Room 
 The Wizard of Oz''

References

External links

1978 births
American male film actors
American male stage actors
American male television actors
Living people
American male actors of Japanese descent
American male actors of Mexican descent
Male actors from Santa Cruz, California
Bisexual male actors
American LGBT people of Asian descent
LGBT Hispanic and Latino American people
LGBT people from California